The 716th Military Police Battalion is a military police battalion of the United States Army based at Fort Campbell, Kentucky. It is a subordinate unit of the 16th Military Police Brigade.

Organization 
The battalion is subordinate to the 16th Military Police Brigade. It is headquartered at Fort Campbell, Kentucky.

History

World War II 
Constituted on 10 January 1942 in the Army as the 716th Military Police Battalion, it was activated during the Second World War at Fort Wadsworth, New York on 15 January 1942.

1950s and 1960s
In September 1962 the battalion, then based at Fort Dix, Trenton, New Jersey, was deployed together with the 5th and 17th Field Hospitals, a public information section and a
composite intelligence detachment as Task Force Charlie, part of the Federal military forces deployed to support the enrolment of James Meredith at the segregated University of Mississippi. Arriving at the university on the morning of 1 October the battalion was used to secure the campus in the aftermath of the overnight rioting. A company from the battalion would remain deployed at the university until 23 July 1963.

Vietnam War 

Company C, 52nd Infantry Regiment arrived in South Vietnam on 1 December 1966 and was assigned to the battalion.

By late 1967 the battalion's mission was security and law enforcement in the Saigon/Cholon/Tan Son Nhut metropolitan area, South Vietnam. Specific security missions, involving approximately 83% of the military police/security guard resources of the battalion, included the US Embassy, the Military Assistance Command, Vietnam (MACV) Complex, VIP and General's quarters, Bachelor Officers’ Quarters (BOQ's), Bachelor Enlisted Quarters (BEQ's) and critical US facilities and installations throughout the city. This security mission was primarily aimed at deterring terrorist acts. The law enforcement mission involved normal military police functions in a metropolitan area, to include criminal investigations. The battalion supported the requirements of the provost marshal, US Army Headquarters Area Command, for military police/security guards within the resources available.

During the Tet Offensive of January–February 1968 the unit played a major role in the defense of Saigon against Vietcong (VC) attacks, in particular the attack on the US Embassy, battle of Cholon and Phu Tho Racetrack and the attack on the Joint General Staff Compound. At the start of the Tet Offensive the battalion was configured to perform traditional military policing roles, however it soon found itself engaged in urban combat for which it was ill-equipped. The battalion was to provide support for USAHAC in the conduct of disaster recovery operations by providing security, damage control and prevention of pilferage. The concept of operations envisioned a disaster or VC destruction such as the blowing up of a US billet (similar to the Victoria Hotel attack) by VC personnel. After confirmation of a disaster by the provost marshal, the battalion was to dispatch a 25-man alert force to the affected area. The team was organised into a control and cordon team which would seal off and clear the damaged area of all unauthorized personnel; a rescue team which would evacuate casualties from the building and a search team to assists explosive ordnance personnel in locating other bombs or explosives. There was no provision in the plan for use of battalion military police as fighting units. This concept was applied in response to the initial attack on the Joint General Staff Compound which was believed to be an attack on BOQ-3 and the alert force was ambushed by VC resulting in 17 MPs killed.

Companies A and B were based at the Capitol BEQ 107 Dong Khanh St, Cholon while Company C was based at MACV headquarters annex. 

Companies A, B and C were inactivated on 29 March 1973 in South Vietnam.

Post-Cold War 
The unit served in the Gulf War (1990–91), Iraq War (2003-4 and 2007-8) and the War in Afghanistan (2001–2021), West Africa Ebola Response (2014-2015)

Honors

Unit decorations

Campaign streamers

References

External links 
 716th MP Battalion Vietnam website

716
Military units and formations in Kentucky